Szécsény is a district in northern part of Nógrád County. Szécsény is also the name of the town where the district seat is found. The district is located in the Northern Hungary Statistical Region.

Geography 
Szécsény District borders with the Slovakian region of Banská Bystrica to the north and west, Salgótarján District to the northeast, Pásztó District to the south, Balassagyarmat District to the southwest. The number of the inhabited places in Szécsény District is 14.

Municipalities 
The district has 1 town and 13 villages.
(ordered by population, as of 1 January 2013)

The bolded municipality is the city.

Demographics

In 2011, it had a population of 19,587 and the population density was 69/km².

Ethnicity
Besides the Hungarian majority, the main minority is the Roma (approx. 3,000).

Total population (2011 census): 19,587
Ethnic groups (2011 census): Identified themselves: 20,415 persons:
Hungarians: 17,548 (85.96%)
Gypsies: 2,686 (13.16%)
Others and indefinable: 181 (0.89%)
Approx. 1,000 persons in Szécsény District did declare more than one ethnic group at the 2011 census.

Religion
Religious adherence in the county according to 2011 census:

Catholic – 14,152 (Roman Catholic – 14,134; Greek Catholic – 17);
Evangelical – 163; 
Reformed – 146; 
other religions – 339; 
Non-religious – 1,044; 
Atheism – 56;
Undeclared – 3,687.

Gallery

See also
List of cities and towns of Hungary

References

External links
 Postal codes of the Szécsény District

Districts in Nógrád County